Landogrozumab (INN; development code LY2495655) is a humanized monoclonal antibody and experimental pharmaceutical drug designed for the treatment of muscle wasting disorders.

This drug was developed by Eli Lilly & Co.

References 

Monoclonal antibodies